Tuesday is an upcoming American-British drama-fantasy film written and directed by Daina O. Pusic in her feature directorial debut. A co-production between A24, the BFI and BBC Film, it stars Julia Louis-Dreyfus and Lola Petticrew as a mother-and-daughter.

Cast
 Julia Louis-Dreyfus
 Lola Petticrew as Tuesday
 Arinzé Kene
 Leah Harvey

Production
In May 2021, it was announced that Daina O. Pusic would make her feature directorial debut with the project, and that Julia Louis-Dreyfus, Lola Petticrew, Arinzé Kene and Leah Harvey had joined the cast. Principal photography began in the United Kingdom in June 2021 with Alexis Zabé as cinematographer, and wrapped in late July.

References

External links

Upcoming films
British drama films
A24 (company) films
BBC Film films
Films about mother–daughter relationships
Upcoming directorial debut films